The Al-Noor Mosque is a mosque in Santo Domingo, National District, Dominican Republic.

History
The mosque was originally a house building which was purchased by the Islamic Circle of Dominican Republic for the amount of DOP 2.85 million. The building was then converted into the first mosque in the country.

Architecture
The mosque building complex also features a pharmacy located behind the mosque building.

See also
 Islam in the Dominican Republic

References

Islam in the Dominican Republic
Mosques in North America
Religious buildings and structures in Santo Domingo